Satipo District is one of eight districts of the Satipo Province in Peru.

References

1940 establishments in Peru